Neohebestola is a genus of longhorn beetles of the subfamily Lamiinae, containing the following species:

 Neohebestola apicalis (Fairmaire & Germain, 1859)
 Neohebestola brasiliensis (Fontes & Martins, 1977)
 Neohebestola concolor (Fabricius, 1798)
 Neohebestola humeralis (Blanchard, 1851)
 Neohebestola luchopegnai Martins & Galileo, 1989
 Neohebestola parvula (Blanchard in Gay, 1851)
 Neohebestola petrosa (Blanchard in Gay, 1851)
 Neohebestola vitticollis (Blanchard in Gay, 1851)

References

Forsteriini